Marc Fontoynont is a professor in illumination engineering at Aalborg University. His research has had an impact on how we look upon one of the world's most famous works of art; the Mona Lisa by Leonardo da Vinci, as he is the man behind the LED-technology that illuminates the painting.

Fontoynont is engaged in development of light for a wide array of use, including for instance the application of LED-light in the traffic. The research is based on his more than 30 thirty years of experience within the field, starting at University of California, Berkeley.

Fontoynont graduated from National Engineering School of State Public Works in 1980. In 1987, he was awarded with an PhD in energetics from Ecole National Supérieure des Mines de Paris.

References 

Year of birth missing (living people)
Living people
Place of birth missing (living people)
Nationality missing
Academic staff of Aalborg University
Mines Paris - PSL alumni